Events in the year 2022 in the Faroe Islands.

Incumbents 
 Monarch – Margrethe II
 High Commissioner – Lene Moyell Johansen
 Prime Minister – Bárður á Steig Nielsen

Events

April 
 31 October – 2022 Danish general election (Faroese constituency only)
 8 December – 2022 Faroese general election

Sports 
 5 March – 22 October: 2022 Faroe Islands Premier League

Deaths

References 

 
2020s in the Faroe Islands
Years of the 21st century in the Faroe Islands
Faroe Islands
Faroe Islands